Bloodvein or Blood-vein may refer to:

Bloodvein River, a tributary of Lake Winnipeg in Ontario and Manitoba, Canada
Bloodvein First Nation, located on the east side of Lake Winnipeg, along the Bloodvein River in Manitoba, Canada
Bloodvein River Airport, located adjacent to Bloodvein River, Manitoba, Canada and serves the Bloodvein First Nation
Blood-vein, a moth of the family Geometridae